Carneirinho is a municipality in the westernmost tip of the Brazilian state of Minas Gerais. Due to its location, it is the only municipality in Minas Gerais to border the state of Mato Grosso do Sul.  the population was 10,066 in a total area of 2,060.720 km². It became a municipality in 1993.

History
The town of Carneirinho was founded in 1954 by the Carneiro family, thus the origin of the name.  The first settlement had begun on the Bom Sucesso cattle ranch  in the late nineteenth century.  In 1941 a general store opened on the banks of the Mutuca stream and houses were built nearby.  The first church was built in 1952, consecrated to Our Lady Aparecida.  In 1962 the district of Carneirinho was established and in 1992 it became a municipality.

Geography
The municipality is composed of the districts of São Sebastião do Pontal, Estrela da Barra and Fátima do Pontal; and the villages of Aparecida do Paranaíba "Barbosa" and Gracilândia "Pereira".

Carneirinho is located at an elevation of 431 meters in the extreme west of the state about 30 km east of the Represa da Ilha Solteira, which forms the Paraná River. It belongs to the  microregion of Frutal. Neighboring municipalities are:
Northeast: Limeira do Oeste
East: Iturama
Southeast: Populina, Mesópolis e Santa Albertina in the state of São Paulo
South: Santa Rita d'Oeste and Santa Clara d'Oeste in the state of São Paulo
Northwest: Itajá in the state of Goiás
West: Aparecida do Taboado and Paranaíba in the state of Mato Grosso do Sul

Distances
Belo Horizonte: 823 km.
Iturama: 55 km.
Uberaba: 331 km.

Economy
The most important economic activities are cattle raising, commerce, light industry, food processing, and agriculture. The GDP in 2005 was R$95,862,000. Carneirinho is in the top tier of municipalities in the state with regard to economic and social development.  there was 01 banking agency in the town. There was a well-developed retail infrastructure serving the surrounding area of cattle and agricultural lands. In the rural area there were 714 establishments occupying about 1,600 workers. 246 of the farms had tractors, a ratio of one in three. There were 1,150 automobiles in all of the municipality, about one for every 7 inhabitants.

Campina Verde is an important agricultural producer.  There were 242,000 head of cattle in 2006, of which 45,000 head were dairy cows.  Cultivated pastures make up the main use of the soil with 160,400 ha, representing 80% of the total area of the municipality.  Natural pasture makes up 5,365 ha (3% of the area).  In permanent crops there are 1,029 ha. planted (0.5% of the total area) with the main crops being sugarcane and manioc.

The crops with a planted area of more than 100 hectares were:
cotton: 190 ha.
sugarcane: 500 ha.
corn: 3,000 ha.
soybeans: 100 ha.

Health and education
In the health sector there were 08 health clinics and no hospitals.  In the educational sector there were 09 primary schools and 03 middle  schools.

Municipal Human Development Index: 0.763 (2000)
State ranking: 199 out of 853 municipalities 
National ranking: 1,593 out of 5,138 municipalities 
Literacy rate: 81%
Life expectancy: 73 (average of males and females)

References

External links
Carneirinho City Hall

Municipalities in Minas Gerais
Populated places established in 1992